After the Storm is the fourth studio album by American singer Monica. It was first released on June 17, 2003 through J Records. Created over a period of three years, in which Monica experienced personal struggles and its original version, All Eyez on Me, was delayed numerous times following the moderate success of single "All Eyez on Me" as well as the leak to Internet file-sharing services and heavy bootlegging after its Japan-wide release, Monica decided to scrap most of the album in favor of new material for which she consulted new collaborators such as Missy Elliott who would receive executive producer credit due to her predominant share of contributions on the album.

The album debuted at number one on the US Billboard 200 chart, Monica's first album to do so, and sold 185,500 copies in its first week. It produced three singles that attained Billboard chart success, including chart topper "So Gone", and has been certified gold by the Recording Industry Association of America for shipments of over 500,000 copies in the United States. After the Storm received generally mixed to positive reviews from music critics. As of November 2014, the album has sold 1,070,000 copies in the United States.

Background
Following the release of her second album The Boy Is Mine (1998) and her contribution to "I've Got to Have It", a collaboration with Jermaine Dupri and rapper Nas, recorded for the soundtrack of the 2000 comedy film Big Momma's House, Monica took a hiatus from her recording career. During the hiatus, she tied up filming commitments on J. J. Abrams's prime time drama series Felicity and the theatrical film Boys and Girls and garnered a starring role in the MTV Films drama Love Song. In an interview with MTV News amid promotion for Oscar Mayer's Jingle Jam Talent Search contest in June 2000, Monica revealed that she was planning to start work on her third album throughout the summer season, with a first single to be released by October of the same year.

In the following month, personal tribulations put a temporary halt on the album's production, when her friend and former boyfriend Jarvis "Knot" Weems committed suicide. Knot left behind a daughter from a previous relationship, who Monica took into care after going into hiatus. She eventually resumed work on her third album in fall 2001, involving her usual stable of producers such as Dallas Austin, production team Soulshock & Karlin, Jermaine Dupri, and Rodney Jerkins and his Darkchild crew. Though originally expected to be released worldwide, All Eyez on Me received a wide release on October 21, 2002 in Japan only. The set was initially scheduled for a US release in July 2002 and then pushed back to September before a final November 12 release date. At the time it was scheduled for domestic release However, All Eyez on Me had been heavily bootlegged in Japan and become widely available through Internet file-sharing services. In addition, the first two singles from the project, "All Eyez on Me" and "Too Hood," had experienced moderate chart success.

Conceptualisation
With the market evolving very quickly and the sound of urban radio shifting to hip hop and edgier artistry, J Records asked Monica to substantially reconstruct the record with a host of new producers, leading to the cancellation of the US release of All Eyez on Me. After the commercial failure of original lead single "All Eyez on Me," a sunny, upbeat groove with a pop feel of which the label thought that it had misled audiences into believing that she was trying to break away from her core R&B fan base with her new album, Monica agreed that she would once again return to the studio, significantly raising the financial stakes of the project. Fresh from the success of her album Under Construction (2002), the label consulted rapper-producer Missy Elliott to work with her. While the pair had never worked together before, Monica, who had felt increasingly frustrated that the album still didn't reflect where she wanted to go artistically after a series of unfruitful recording sessions, instantly connected with Elliott after their first night in a studio in Miami where the rapper had played demos with old-school soul sounds to her.

Elliott recorded three full-length songs with Monica that dramatically altered the course of the album and prompted J Records to replace former executive producer Jermaine Dupri with her. Additional reording sessions were set up with producers BAM & Ryan, Jasper DaFatso, and Jazze Pha, with rappers DMX, Dirtbag, Busta Rhymes and Mia X, and singers Tweet and Tyrese joining. Labelmate Mýa was originally set to lend her voice to a track, but was eventually replaced by Faith Evans; the untitled song did not, however, make the final track listing. Although the album was still planned to be titled All Eyez on Me until its completion, the singer decided to change the album title to a more personal one after years of private tribulations: "I wanted this to be more of my testimony," Monica told Jet Magazine in 2003. "I feel blessed to still be here after a lot of things that I've been through. I wanted to share certain things with people. Not so much as what I've been through, but how I made it through. That's what the album reflects [...] It's really the reason I titled my album After the Storm." In 2016, she further commented: "Everything about After the Storm was about my life after the hardship. This album came when I felt whole enough to make a record again."

Songs
The standard edition of After the Storm compromises thirteen tracks, five of which were transferred from All Eyez on Me. It opens with "Intro," a section about people stuck in a traffic jam that ends in a drive-by shooting provoked by someone, voiced by Missy Elliott, playing Monica's "So Gone" too loudly. After the Storm then launches into the Elliott-crafted song "Get It Off," a club-friendly, percussive, 1980s-style jam with an percolating groove, that samples American hip hop group Strafe's single "Set It Off" (1984) and features uncredited vocals from rapper Dirtbag. Third track "So Gone," another retro-soul reverie, has an 1970s soul groove that samples from American vocal group The Whispers' "You Are Number One" (1976) and is built upon old-school touches including horns and vinyl surface noise." Elliott concinved Monica to record a rap portion for the song which is about a woman almost losing her mind over an unfaithful lover. The singer explores a painful personal relationship on "U Should've Known Better", a Jermaine Dupri-produced slow jam, set against a pulsating backbeat, about a girl who stands by her man during his jail term. Critics noted that it alludes to Monica's relationship with C-Murder who was arrested in connection with murder in 2002.

 Monica plays the other woman in "Don't Gotta Go Home," a sassy, guitar-led duet, produced by BAM & Ryan, with rapper DMX as her straying husband. "Knock Knock," a "get back record" and literal, thematic sequel to "So Gone," also produced by Elliott, similarly simmers with old-school soul sounds, sampling from American vocal band The Masqueraders' "It's a Terrible Thing to Waste Your Love" (1976). It was described as "erotic boogie fare," in which she sends away a lover who used to take her for granted. Rapper Kanye West, whose mixtape track "Apologize" (2005) the Monica song is based on, is credited as a co-producer. "Breaks My Heart," produced by Danish duo Soulshock and Karlin, is a "heartbreaking personal lament" in which "a classic slow rhythm-and-blues piano rolls," while the singer "apologizes to the man who stayed with her despite her affairs." Eighth track "I Wrote This Song," neatly set off by a sample from American singer Shuggie Otis' "Aht Uh Mi Hed" (1970), deals with Weems' suicide. Monica commented that writing the song was a healing process for her as well as a "way of sharing the intimate situation between [them]."

Rodney Jerkins-produced "Ain't Gonna Cry No More" was described as an upbeat "angry kiss-off." "Go to Bed Mad," a duet with singer Tyrese, is a "soulful" and "heartfelt jam" which has a couple asking each other to compromise after an argument before they go to bed at night. On pop ballad "Hurts the Most," another Soulshock and Karlin contribution, consisting of acoustic guitars and an understated drum pattern, Monica says goodbye to a former lover who has entered a new relationship since their last meeting, though she still pines for him. Jazze Pha-produced "That's My Man" is an acoustic-guitar-laced mid-tempo track, talking about a woman's proudness of her man. The standard edition of After the Storm ends with "Outro," a remix version of "So Gone," that features rapper Busta Rhymes as well as more prominent background vocals from singer Tweet. Monica amitted that she was initially intimidated by recording her rhymes alongside Rhymes. Bonus track "Too Hood," an upbeat song produced and featuring Dupri, was described as "an image-mongering song in which Monica tells a guy who's not rough enough that she's 'too hood' for" him.

Singles
While "Don't Gotta Go Home," a collaboration with rapper DMX, was considered to be released as the album's fourth single at times, After the Storm ultimately spawned four singles. Lead single "So Gone" became Monica's biggest commercial successes in years, reaching number 10 on the US Billboard Hot 100 and spent five consecutive weeks on top of the Hot R&B/Hip-Hop Songs. It was eventually ranked fourth on the 2003 Hot R&B/Hip-Hop Songs year-end chart. Follow-up single "Knock Knock" never made it out of the lower half of the Billboard Hot 100, while the simultaneously released "Get It Off" reached number 13 on the Hot Dance Club Play chart. After the Storms fourth and final single, "U Should've Known Better", received a late release in mid-2004 and became another top 20 hit for the singer.

Critical reception

After the Storm received generally mixed to positive reviews from music critics. AllMusic editor Andy Kellman gave the album four out of five stars and found that it picked up where previous album The Boy Is Mine "left off with nary a speed bump. Rather than come across as if there's lost time being made up, the album has all the assuredness and smart developments that should keep Monica's younger longtime followers behind her – all the while holding the ability to appeal to a wider spectrum of R&B and hip-hop fans [...] with just the right amount of swagger added to the singer's more wide-eyed personality of the '90s." Caroline Sullivan from The Guardian commented that while "executive producer Missy Elliott is reliably ebullient on the burbling party number "Get It Off", and her enthusiasm clearly rubbed off on Monica, who essays some fawnlike rapping of her own on "So Gone" and "Knock Knock", things plod a bit in the second half, though, making After the Storm more it'll-do than must-buy".

Vanessa Jones from Entertainment Weekly also called the non-Elliott-produced material mediocre, noting that "super producer Missy Elliott tarts things up with a trio of streetwise party anthems. Otherwise, in between are bland ballads and derivative midtempo tunes that often fail to match the creative heights of Monica's lush, church-trained voice. Only on a four-track bonus CD do vocals and music achieve equal footing as the singer moves beyond hackneyed beats to explore gospel, hip-hop, and quiet-storm grooves." Natalie Nichols of the Los Angeles Times also complimented Elliott's input on the album. She added that "great R&B moments have come from singers who dwell on tragedy as intensely as on overcoming. Clearly, the title After the Storm implies moving on rather than wallowing, but the album too often feels generic, despite the personal sentiments Monica lets out [...] So maybe she should've dwelt a little more, at that."

Commercial performance
After the Storm became Monica's first number-one album in the United States debuting on the Billboard 200 with first week sales of 185,500, during the week ending on July 5, 2003. As of 2020, this remains her highest-selling week within her discography. On the Billboard 
Top R&B/Hip-Hop Albums chart the album debuted at 84 and reached its peak at number two, the following week later. On July 17, 2003, the album was certified gold by the Recording Industry Association of America (RIAA) for exceeding domestic shipments in excess of 500,000 copies. After spending 24 consecutive weeks on the Billboard 200, Billboard ranked it at number 104 on their year-end chart. The album also placed at number 36 on their Top R&B/Hip-Hop Albums year-end chart. By March 2007 After the Storm had sold 997,000 copies,  and as of August 2010 the album's total sales stand at over 1,070,000 copies sold in the US, according to Billboard. In Canada the album peaked at number 56, meanwhile in the United Kingdom it debuted and peaked at number 32 on the UK R&B Albums Chart.

Track listingNotes  signifies a co-producer
  signifies an additional producer
Sample credits
 "Get It Off" contains a sample of Strafe's 1984 "Set It Off".
 "So Gone" contains a sample of The Whispers' 1976 "You Are Number One".
 "Knock Knock" contains a sample of The Masqueraders' 1976 "It's a Terrible Thing to Waste Your Love".
 "I Wrote This Song" contains a sample of Shuggie Otis' 1970 "Aht Uh Mi He'd".
 "All Eyez on Me" contains a sample of Michael Jackson's 1982 "P.Y.T. (Pretty Young Thing)".
 "What Part of the Game" contains a sample of Pimp C's 1996 "Break 'Em Off Somethin.

PersonnelProductionMonica Arnold – album producer
Melinda Dancil – executive album coordinator
Clive Davis – album producer
Missy Elliott – executive producer
DeVyne Stephens – creative directionPerformance creditsMonica Arnold – vocals, background vocals
Isaac Carree – background vocals
Shamora Crawford – background vocals
Dirtbag – vocals
DMX – vocals
Jermaine Dupri – vocals

Mia X – vocals
Missy Elliott – additional vocals, background vocals
New Birth Praise Team – vocals
Busta Rhymes – vocals
Tweet – background vocals
Tyrese – vocals, background vocalsVisuals and imageryAlexander Allen – styling
Leondra Crew – hair styling
Roxanna Floyd – makeup

Chris Lebeau – photo shoot production
Warwick Saint – photography
Alexis Yraola – art direction, designInstruments Montez Arnold – keyboards
 Eric D. Jackson – guitar
 Mark Kelly – bass guitar
 Tommy Martin – guitar

 Billy Odum – guitar
 Charles Pettaway – guitar
 R.J. Ronquillo – guitarTechnical'''

Marcella Araica – engineering assistance
Rich Balmer – engineering
Carlos Bedoya – engineering
Leslie Braithwaite – mixing
Jimmy Briggs – engineering assistance
Ralph Cacciurri – engineering assistance
Demacio Castellon – engineering
Jermaine Dupri – mixing
Brian Frye – engineering
John Horesco IV – engineering assistance
Scott Kieklak – mixing
Marc Stephen Lee – engineering assistance
Carlton Lynn – engineering, mixing

Bill Malina – engineering
Fabian Marasciullo – engineering, mixing
Manny Marroquin – mixing
Michael McCoy – engineering
Tadd Mingo – engineering assistance
Dexter Simmons – mixing
Phil Tan – mixing
Sam Thomas – engineering
Rabeka Tuinei – engineering assistance
Javier Valverde – engineering assistance
Arnold Wolfe – engineering
Chris Young – engineering assistance

Charts

Weekly charts

Year-end charts

Certifications

Release history

References

External links

 After the Storm'' at Discogs

2003 albums
Albums produced by Bryan-Michael Cox
Albums produced by DJ Scratch
Albums produced by Rodney Jerkins
Albums produced by Jazze Pha
Albums produced by Jermaine Dupri
Albums produced by Kanye West
Albums produced by Missy Elliott
J Records albums
Monica (singer) albums